Geohorizon is an annual technical symposium conducted by the Society of Geoinformatics Engineers, a society organised by the undergraduate students studying Geoinformatics at College of Engineering, Guindy. It is one of the first Geospatial symposiums to be organized and held in India, conducted since 2005. 
"GeoHorizon" is one of the flagship events for the students in the geospatial domain. It provides a platform to showcase their talent and induce team spirit. It has a nationwide reach with industries and sponsorships that connects students of both undergraduate and graduate level.

For past thirteen editions, Geohorizon has been platform for young enthusiasts to explore the depths of the latest in Geospatial technology. It has broken myths, opened new avenues and redefined every perception of Geomatics.

Geohorizon is conducted every year in the early week of March. The motto of the symposium is to share the knowledge of geospatial technologies within the engineering students. The symposium extends for three days. 
Workshops, technical events, fun events and guest lectures are conducted as part of the symposium.

Geohorizon 2019 - organized by the students of 2015-2019 batch 
GeoHorizon ′19

External links
Official website of the Society of Geoinformatics Engineers
Official E-Journal of the Society of Geoinformatics Engineers
Official Website for Geohorizon' 09

Academic conferences
Geographic information systems
Science and technology in Tamil Nadu